Ruhana Kuddus, or Rohana Kudus (Old Spelling: Roehana Koeddoes; December 20, 1884 – August 17, 1972) was the first female Indonesian journalist, founder of the newspaper Soenting Melajoe, and an activist for women's emancipation.

Biography

Early life

She was born Siti Ruhana on December 20, 1884, in the village of Koto Gadang, Agam Regency, in the hinterland of West Sumatra, Dutch East Indies. Her father Mohammad Rasjad Maharaja Soetan was the chief public prosecutor of Jambi Residency and later of Medan. Ruhana was the half-sister of Sutan Sjahrir, and a cousin of Agus Salim, both important intellectuals and politicians in the Indonesian independence movement. She was also an aunt of Indonesian poet Chairil Anwar. Ruhana was intelligent although she did not receive a formal education. She often studied with her father, who taught her in reading and language studies. When her father was assigned to Alahan Panjang, West Sumatera, she asked her neighbors (including the wife of another prosecutor) to teach her reading and writing in Jawi and Latin script, and household skills such as Lace-making. After the death of her mother in 1897, she returned to Koto Gadang and became increasingly interested in teaching the girls there to learn handicrafts and to read the Quran, despite still being a child herself.

Marriage and family

In 1908, at age 24, Ruhana married Abdoel Koeddoes, a notary public, and became known as Roehana Koeddoes. Abdoel Koeddoes was supportive of his wife's effort to educate women.

Educational career
Ruhana's earliest efforts at a more organized form of education came in 1905 when she created an artisanal school in Koto Gadang.

In February 1911, Ruhana decided to found a more organized educational society for women, named , with a school aiming specifically to teach girls crafts and skills beyond their ordinary household duties, as well as to read Jawi and Latin writing and to manage a household. During this time, she faced opposition from numerous sources who were resistant to change and advancement of women. With the support of her husband, Ruhana persisted and eventually persuaded people to her side, eventually recruiting around sixty students.

The school received official recognition from the government in 1915, and became a center for artisans to work with the Dutch government on sales of their work in major cities and overseas. It was the only craft producer that met the international standards of purchase.

She continued to work in education even while becoming a journalist. In 1916 she was appointed as a teacher at a school for Indonesians in Payakumbuh, West Sumatra.

Journalism career

Skilled in writing, Koeddoes did not stop with teaching women crafts. She believed in educating women as a whole.

Maharadja had already heard about Ruhana's educational activities, and so on July 10, 1912, the first issue of Soenting Melajoe (EYD: Sunting Melayu), a Malay language newspaper with women as its intended audience, was launched. The name of the newspaper refers to the Sunting, a traditional headdress worn by women, but it is also a play on another word meaning to edit or correct. Ruhana became chief editor, assisted by Mahyuddin Datuk Sutan Maharadja's daughter Zoebaidah Ratna Djoewita. She stated that the newspaper would aim to improve the education level of Indonesian women, especially as few of them could read Dutch and relatively few modern educational materials were available in the Malay language (Indonesian). The newspaper discussed the social issues of the day, including traditionalism, polygamy, divorce, and girls' education. Most of the contributors were wives of government officials or aristocrats. Eventually the continued publication of the newspaper inspired the creation of more educational societies like the one Ruhana had created in 1911.

In 1913 she accompanied the Westenenk family to the Netherlands for a time to improve her education. After returning to the Indies she continued to edit .

In early 1921 Ruhana left  for unknown reasons and Soetan Maharadja appointed his own daughter Retna Tenoen as the new editor. However,  did not last long after that and apparently printed its last issue in January 1921 along with Soetan Maharadja's other paper .

Death and honours 
Roehana Koeddoes died in Jakarta on August 17, 1972, the 27the year that  the Indonesian Independence Day was celebrated. She was buried in Karet Bivak Cemetery

In 1974, the regional government of West Sumatra honored her as the first female journalist (Wartawati Pertama). She was also awarded as the Indonesian Press Pioneer (Perintis Pers Indonesia) in 1987 and Star on Service, 1st Class (Bintang Jasa Utama) in 2007.

Since November 7, 2019, the Indonesian government declared Roehana Koeddoes as a National Hero of Indonesia through Presidential Decree no. 120/TK/2019 and given to her grandchild as heir on following day. Two years later, she was celebrated in a Google Doodle.

Legacy 
Her name is used (with popular version) for a hall at the Gelora Haji Agus Salim Sports Complex, as street name in Padang, including a trademark of keripik sanjai which is located on the same road.

Notes

References

External links 

  
  merdeka.com
  historia.id

1884 births
1972 deaths
People from Agam Regency
Minangkabau people
Indonesian journalists
Indonesian women journalists
Indonesian women writers
20th-century journalists
Newspaper editors from the Dutch East Indies
Indonesian newspaper editors